Rhagoba is a genus of moths of the family Crambidae described by Frederic Moore in 1888.

Species
Rhagoba obvellata Du & Li, 2012
Rhagoba octomaculalis (Moore, 1867)

References

Spilomelinae
Crambidae genera
Taxa named by Frederic Moore